Tracey Perry is a Canadian politician, who served in the Newfoundland and Labrador House of Assembly from 2007 to 2019, representing the district of Fortune Bay-Cape La Hune as a member of the Progressive Conservative Party. She previously served as the Parliamentary Assistant to Premier Paul Davis.

Early life 

She is the youngest of thirteen children. Perry grew up and attended school in St. Alban's before leaving the region to attend university. She holds a Bachelor of Commerce (co-operative) degree from Memorial University, and upon completion of university in 1993, she returned to her rural hometown of St. Alban's.

Professional life 

Upon returning to her hometown in 1993 she established and operated TMP Consulting Inc. In 1995, Perry began a successful career as executive director for the Coast of Bays Corporation (Regional Economic Development Board).

In addition, Perry has worked with Consulting and Audit Canada in Ottawa, as well as the head office of the Atlantic Canada Opportunities Agency in Moncton. She participated in a Newfoundland to Iceland Economic Study Mission (1997) and a Trade Team Canada Mission to Japan (1999) and a Team Canada Trade Mission to Iceland 2007 where she gained insight into development approaches of other jurisdictions and the challenges of small business in a global marketplace.

Perry served as a Girl Guide Leader from 1993-1996, then became president of the Bay d’ Espoir Development Association (1997-1998). From 1999 to 2001, she chaired the Newfoundland Salmonid Growers Association, and was a member of the Canadian Aquaculture Industry Association’s Standing Committee on Human Resources from 2002 to 2004. She also served on the Rural Secretariat for Council #5 from 2003-2007.

Political life 
On October 9, 2007, Perry became the first woman ever elected to serve the district of Fortune Bay-Cape La Hune as a member of the House of Assembly.

In 2008, Perry was injured in a car crash just five months after being elected. She spent months recuperating from a serious neck injury that forced her to attend House of Assembly sessions that spring wearing a neck brace.

In 2014, Perry was appointed Parliamentary Secretary to the Minister of Innovation, Business and Rural Development and subsequently Parliamentary Assistant to the Premier serving until the Davis government was defeated in the 2015 general election.

She was re-elected in the 2011 and 2015 general elections.

In 2018, Perry gained notable attention for her role in the House of Assembly harassment scandal; specifically for filing a complaint against then-Cabinet Minister Eddie Joyce.

Perry did not run for re-election in the 2019 provincial election.

Electoral record 

|-

|-

|NDP
|Susan Skinner
|align="right"|665
|align="right"|17.26%
|align="right"|
|-

|}

|-

|-

|-

|NDP
|Sheldon Hynes
|align="right"|84
|align="right"|2.09%
|align="right"|
|}

References

Progressive Conservative Party of Newfoundland and Labrador MHAs
Living people
Memorial University of Newfoundland alumni
Women MHAs in Newfoundland and Labrador
21st-century Canadian politicians
21st-century Canadian women politicians
Year of birth missing (living people)